Peat Cutting Monday or Peat Cutting Day is a public holiday in the Falkland Islands that is celebrated on the first Monday in October every year.

Traditionally, Peat Cutting Day was the time of year when Falkland Islanders went out to cut cubes of surface-soil peat which was then used as the primary fuel for heating homes and cooking food in the islands. In 2002, the Executive Council of the Falkland Islands made it an official public holiday to be celebrated on the first Monday in October every year, replacing Falklands Day, which had been celebrated in August.

Little peat cutting takes place in modern times, with the Islanders instead using the day to go fishing and camping.

References

Annual events in the Falkland Islands
October observances
Falkland Islands culture
Peat mining